Ben Fogle: New Lives in the Wild is a television series on Channel 5 hosted by English adventurer Ben Fogle and produced by Motion Content Group and Renegade Pictures. The programme shows, in a series of unconnected episodes, Fogle meeting people who have adopted 'alternative' lifestyles that are primarily 'off-the-grid' in some of the more remote locations on Earth. 

Fogle hosted a spin-off series in 2015 called New Lives in the Wild UK with families in British locations, while 2020's Ben Fogle: Make a New Life in the Country is of a similar premise. As of 2022, the UK-based programmes and Return to the Wild spin-offs have been brought under the main New Lives in the Wild name in the press, on EPGs and video-on-demand service My5, with these episodes not being part of a separate series.

Premise
The series follows adventurer Fogle as he meets people who have given up the rat race to live a simpler life in remote corners of the world, often without modern amenities. In each episode, Fogle immerses himself in their lives to explore their motivations and highs and lows, whilst living in tough and harsh conditions in the wild.

Series overview

Episodes

Season 1 (2013)

Season 2 (2014)

Season 3 (2014)

Season 4 (2015)

Season 5 (2016)

Season 6 (2017)

Ben Fogle: Return to the Wild (2017 - 2018)

Season 7 (2018)

Season 8 (2019)

Season 9 (2019)

Season 10 (2019)

Season 11 (2020)

Season 12: Ben Fogle: Return to the Wild (2020)

Season 13 (2021)

Season 14: Ben Fogle: Return to the Wild (2021)

Season 15 (2021)

Season 16 (2022)

Season 17 (2023)

Notes

References

2013 British television series debuts
Channel 5 (British TV channel) original programming
English-language television shows
Television series by Warner Bros. Television Studios